Anna Higgs is a film producer known for 20,000 Days on Earth, Dark Horse and High-Rise. Higgs is a creative executive working at the intersection of film and digital storytelling. She is currently Director of Entertainment Partnerships at Facebook & Instagram in Northern Europe.

Early life and career 
Higgs co-founded production company Quark Films in 2006. From 2011 to 2015 Higgs joined Film4 as Commission Editor and Head of Digital of Film4.0 Her first feature film for Film4 was A Field in England. In 2012 she was selected as one of the inaugural Time Out ‘Culture 100’. From 2015 to 2017 Higgs was a creative director of NOWNESS. Higgs is serving as an elected member of the Film Committee Bafta since 2018.

References

External links 
 

Living people
1978 births
English film producers
English documentary filmmakers
People from Birmingham, West Midlands
British women film producers
Facebook employees